The Hermes class were a group of four vessels designed by John Edye of the Surveyor's Department to specifications outlined by Captain William Symonds, the Surveyor of the Navy. The design was approved in 1834. The vessels would be powered by a 140 nominal horsepower engine and carry an armament of two brass 9-pounder guns. The ships would be built in three Royal Dockyards (Portsmouth, Chatham and Sheerness), however, the Chatham vessel was transferred to Sheerness in 1837 prior to being laid down. Hermes was re-engined and lengthen in 1842, Megaera was wrecked in Jamaica in 1843. the remaining vessels served on many different stations of the Empire. Acheron was sold in 1855, Hermes went to the Breakers in 1864 and Volcano lasted until 1894.

Acheron was the second named vessel since it was used for an 8-gun Bomb, purchased in October 1803 then captured by the French in the Mediterranean and burnt on 3 February 1805.

Hermes was the sixth named vessel since it was used for a 12-gun brig sloop, captured from the Dutch (Mercurius) by Sylph at Texel on 12 May 1596 and foundered in January 1797.Megaera was the second named vessel since it was used for a 14-gun Fireship, launched by Teague of Ipswich in May 1783 and sold to J. Darkin on 3 April 1817.Volcano was the sixth named vessel since it was used for an 8-gun Fireship, purchased 1778, commissioned 31 July 1778 and sold 7 May 1781.

Design and specifications
The first three vessels were ordered in 1834 with last one in 1837. the ships were laid down at the rate of one per year between 1834 and 1837 with first pair at Portsmouth and the second pair at Sheerness. The first was launched in 1835 and the last in 1838. The builder's measure was calculated at 715 43/94 tons whereas the vessels displaced 1,006 tons.

In 1842 Hermes underwent an engine change. During that process her hull was lengthened.

The machinery for Acheron, Volcano and Megaera was supplied by Seaward and Capel and Hermes was supplied by the Butterley Company of Derbyshire. All vessels were equipped with two fire-tube rectangular boilers. All engines were basically 2-cylinder vertical single expansion (VSE) side-lever steam engines rated at 140 nominal horsepower (NHP) except Acheron which was rated at 160 NHP. Hermes was originally fitted with Morgan's paddle wheels from the original Hermes of 1830. In 1838 she was fitted with cycloidal paddle wheels. Hermes had her original engine removed at Woolwich in 1840, and after which she was lengthened, in 1843 a new Maudslay 220 nominal horsepower 'Siamese'-type steam engine was fitted. Pictures show Acheron with a barque rig.

All four ships were initially armed with two 9-pounder (13 1/2 hundredweight (cwt)) (muzzle-loading smooth bore MLSB) brass guns. Between 1842 and 1843 they were re-armed with one 8-inch 52 cwt muzzle loading shell gun on a pivot mount and two 32-pounder (17 cwt) carronades. They had a complement of approximately 135 men.

Initial cost of vessels
Acheron: Total Cost £25,509 (Hull - £16,819; Machinery - £8,690)
Hermes: Total Cost £24,452
Megaera Total Cost: £27,778 (Hull - £15,161; machinery - £8,983; fitting - £3,634)
Volcano Total Cost: £27,884 (hull - £17,011; machinery - £8,875; fitting - £1,867)

Ships

Notes

Citations

References
 Lyon Winfield, The Sail & Steam Navy List, All the Ships of the Royal Navy 1815 to 1889, by David Lyon & Rif Winfield, published by Chatham Publishing, London © 2004, 
 Winfield, British Warships in the Age of Sail (1817 – 1863), by Rif Winfield, published by Seaforth Publishing, England © 2014, e, Chapter 11 Steam Paddle Vessels, Vessels acquired since November 1830, Hermes Class
 Colledge, Ships of the Royal Navy, by J.J. Colledge, revised and updated by Lt Cdr Ben Warlow and Steve Bush, published by Seaforth Publishing, Barnsley, Great Britain, © 2020, e  (EPUB)
 The Navy List, published by His Majesty's Stationery Office, London

Paddle sloops of the Royal Navy
Sloop classes